Stan Getz Quartet Live in Paris is a live album by saxophonist Stan Getz which was recorded France in 1982 but not released on the French Dreyfus Jazz label until 1996.

Reception 

The Allmusic site rated the album with 4 stars.

Track listing
 "O Grande Amor" (Antônio Carlos Jobim) - 6:04 	
 "Blood Count" (Billy Strayhorn) - 5:02
 "Airegin" (Sonny Rollins) - 8:28
 "Blue Skies" (Irving Berlin) - 7:28
 "On the Up and Up" (Jim McNeely) - 9:46
 "I Wanted to Say" (Victor Lewis) - 10:15
 "Tempus Fugit" (Bud Powell) - 10:06

Personnel 
Stan Getz - tenor saxophone
Jim McNeely - piano
Marc Johnson - bass
Victor Lewis - drums

References 

1996 live albums
Stan Getz live albums